Richmond Green, also known as the Richmond Green Sports Centre and Park is a city-owned and operated facility in Richmond Hill, Ontario, Canada. Next to Richmond Green to its north is Richmond Green Secondary School and Richmond Green Public Library.

Amenities
Some of the facilities and activities offered at the Centre include:
 Tom Graham Arena (2 ice pads)
 Sports Hall of Fame
 4 softball diamonds
 3 baseball diamonds
 4 mini soccer pitches
 1 pro regulation size soccer playing field
 soccer leagues
 open picnic areas with shelters
 2 agricultural barns and paddocks
 indoor lawn bowling league
 skatepark
 waterplay park

References

Municipal parks in Ontario
Buildings and structures in Richmond Hill, Ontario
Geography of the Regional Municipality of York